The 2018–19 season was Arsenal's 27th season in the Premier League, 109th overall season in the top flight and 100th consecutive season in the top flight of English football. The club participated in the Premier League and the UEFA Europa League, and participated in the FA Cup and the EFL Cup.

This was the Arsenal's first season in 22 years without manager Arsène Wenger. For the second consecutive season, Arsenal qualified for the UEFA Europa League, improving on the last season's result and reaching the final where they were defeated by rivals Chelsea. This was the club's first and only full season under manager Unai Emery.

Review

Pre-season
Arsenal began their off-season by completing some squad alterations. They started by announcing the departure of club captain Per Mertesacker, who retired to become their new academy coach. After six years at the club, Santi Cazorla's departure was also announced upon the expiry of his contract. Further, Petr Čech, Héctor Bellerín, Mohamed Elneny, Mesut Özil, Granit Xhaka and Ainsley Maitland-Niles all received new squad numbers, with the latter two also extending their contracts with the club.

After completing a clearout of backroom staff to coincide with their new club-model following the retirement of long-term manager Arsène Wenger, Spaniard Unai Emery was appointed as the club's new head coach.

The first signing of the Emery era was Swiss right-back Stephan Lichtsteiner, who joined on a free transfer from Juventus on 5 June. The club then signed German goalkeeper Bernd Leno from Bayer Leverkusen two weeks later, for a rumored fee of £19.2 million. Meanwhile, club stalwart Jack Wilshere departed following the expiry of his contract, after 17 years at the club, and Greek central defender Sokratis joined the club from Borussia Dortmund for £14.8 million on 8 July. Shortly thereafter, the club signed defensive midfielder Lucas Torreira from Sampdoria for a reported fee of £26.4 million on 10 July, and announced the transfer of Matteo Guendouzi from Lorient for a rumoured £7 million a day later.

August
On 7 August 2018, Alisher Usmanov announced that he would accept an offer from American businessman Stan Kroenke to buy his 30% stake in Arsenal for £550 million, in a deal that would allow Kroenke to take full control of the club.

Arsenal's first game was against reigning champions Manchester City on 12 August. They lost the game 2–0 after goals by Raheem Sterling and Bernardo Silva. The following game was against London rivals Chelsea on 18 August. Arsenal lost again, this time 3–2 though they had chances to get more from the game, courtesy of goals by Pedro, Álvaro Morata and Marcos Alonso while Henrikh Mkhitaryan and Alex Iwobi scored for Arsenal.

Arsenal's first win was a 3–1 victory against West Ham United on 25 August. Marko Arnautović scored first to put West Ham in front, but Nacho Monreal equalised minutes later, and an own goal by Issa Diop and a late goal by Danny Welbeck won the game for Arsenal.

September

Arsenal's first game in September and 4th game in the Premier League, was a 3–2 victory over Cardiff City on 2 September. Shkodran Mustafi scored the opening goal from a Granit Xhaka corner, but Víctor Camarasa equalised just before the break. After the restart, Pierre-Emerick Aubameyang scored his first goal of the season to give Arsenal the lead. Cardiff equalised again from a Danny Ward header, but Alexandre Lacazette ensured the victory with a thumping shot to give Arsenal another three points.

After the international break, Arsenal were the visitors against Newcastle United. After a dull first half, Granit Xhaka scored a stunning free kick to give Arsenal the lead. Mesut Özil doubled the advantage on his 200th appearance for Arsenal. Late on, Ciaran Clark scored in stoppage-time to give Newcastle hope. In the end, it was not enough as Arsenal won their third consecutive game 2–1.

Arsenal started the Europa League with a 4–2 victory over Vorskla Poltava. Aubameyang opened the scoring after a counterattack. Danny Welbeck doubled the advantage, before Aubameyang and Özil both scored to lead 4–0. However, Vorskla scored two goals late in the game though Arsenal still went away with victory.

Arsenal were at the Emirates against Everton. Lacazette scored a stunning opening goal, curling a shot into the top right corner. Moments later, Aubameyang scored a second for Arsenal, tapping in from close range, though Aubameyang was in an offside position. Nevertheless, Arsenal cruised to their fifth consecutive victory in all competitions.

To start off the EFL Cup campaign, Arsenal won 3–1 against Championship side Brentford. Arsenal scored twice through Welbeck, although Alan Judge pulled one back for Brentford. Alexandre Lacazette wrapped up the victory during stoppage-time to ensure Arsenal would progress to the next round. During the final match of September for Arsenal, they won 2–0 against Watford. Bernd Leno made his Premier League debut as a substitute after Petr Čech came off injured. Arsenal opened the scoring through a Craig Cathcart own goal following pressure by Lacazette. Özil doubled the lead when Lacazette squared the ball across for him to tap home. Arsenal came away with their seventh consecutive victory in all competitions and their fifth in the league.

October 
Due to political tensions, Henrikh Mkhitaryan did not travel to Azerbaijan for Arsenal's Europa League match against Qarabağ. Arsenal nevertheless prevailed, 3–0, with Sokratis, Matteo Guendouzi and Emile Smith Rowe all scoring their debut goals.

Arsenal's strong form continued with a dominant 5–1 victory over Fulham. Although the match was tied 1–1 at half-time, Arsenal scored four second-half goals to extend their winning run to nine in all competitions. Aaron Ramsey scored just 39 seconds after being introduced as a substitute; two goals each by Lacazette and Aubameyang completed the scoresheet. A 3–1 victory against Leicester City on 22 October 2018 saw Özil become the highest scoring German player of the Premier League era, with 30 goals. They continued the winning form with a 1–0 victory against Sporting in the Europa League, with Danny Welbeck getting the deciding goal. However, Arsenal's winning streak was stopped at eleven with a 2–2 draw against Crystal Palace at Selhurst Park.

For their final match in October, Arsenal faced League One side Blackpool in the EFL Cup. The Gunners held a 2–0 lead courtesy of goals by Stephan Lichtsteiner and Emile Smith Rowe, but a second yellow card to Matteo Guendouzi allowed Blackpool to cut the lead to 2–1. Arsenal held on to advance to a quarterfinal matchup against Tottenham Hotspur.

November 
Arsenal hosted Liverpool on 3 November 2018. A late strike by Alexandre Lacazette earned a point for the Gunners after James Milner gave Liverpool a second-half lead. In Europe, a 0–0 draw with Sporting secured passage into the round of 32, before a 1–1 draw with Wolverhampton Wanderers, where Henrikh Mkhitaryan's late strike ruled out Ivan Cavaleiro's opener.

After the international break, the Gunners played Bournemouth. A Jefferson Lerma own goal put them up before Joshua King equalized in first-half stoppage time. However, Aubameyang scored the winner to hand the Gunners their first victory of the month. Their final game of November was against Vorskla in the Europa League. UEFA decided before the match that it was to be moved from Poltava to Kyiv due to martial law in Ukraine, and Arsenal ran out 3–0 winners, with goals from Smith Rowe, Ramsey (from the penalty spot) and Joe Willock. This game also marked the debuts of Zech Medley, Charlie Gilmour, and Bukayo Saka, all from the substitute's bench, and confirmed that Arsenal would progress as group winners.

December 
Arsenal hosted the first North London derby of the season on 2 December 2018. They took an early 1–0 lead after Aubameyang converted a penalty in the 10th minute following a Jan Vertonghen handball in the box. However, Spurs scored two goals in a span of five minutes to take a 2–1 lead at halftime. Emery made two substitutions and tactical changes at halftime, and the Gunners responded brilliantly, scoring three goals en route to a 4–2 comeback win; Aubameyang netted a brace and became the first player to score ten goals in the 2018–19 Premier League season; other goals from Alexandre Lacazette, and Lucas Torreira, of which was his first goal since joining the club.

Arsenal continued their unbeaten run against rivals Manchester United at Old Trafford. In what was a dull match, Rob Holding and Aaron Ramsey both suffered injuries, the former tearing his anterior cruciate ligament, thus ruling him out for the rest of the season. The game ended in a 2–2 draw, despite Arsenal scoring two goals which were disallowed in the second half.

Arsenal bounced back from their dropped points at Old Trafford with a 1–0 victory against Huddersfield at the Emirates. Alexandre Lacazette had a goal wrongly disallowed in the first half, and Arsenal finally broke the deadlock through a stunning overhead kick from Lucas Torreira, thus sealing the three points for Arsenal in an unsatisfying performance.

Arsenal won their final Europa League Group game at home against Qarabag. Alexandre Lacazette scored the only goal of the game in a 1–0 victory.

Arsenal lost 3–2 against Southampton at St. Mary's Stadium, thus ending their 22 games unbeaten run. Danny Ings opened the scoring for Southampton, but Henrikh Mkhitaryan equalized for Arsenal with a header. Ings got his second of the game just before halftime. In the second half, Henrikh Mkhitaryan equalized once again with a deflected effort. However, Charlie Austin scored in the 85th minute, capitalizing on a Bernd Leno error to nod home and defeat the Gunners.

The next match for Arsenal was a North London Derby at the Emirates against Tottenham in the EFL Cup. Tottenham got their revenge on Arsenal for the 4–2 defeat in the league with a 2–0 win, knocking out the Gunners from the competition.

Arsenal responded to their two consecutive losses with a 3–1 victory over Burnley. Pierre-Emerick Aubameyang opened the scoring in the 14th minute after a brilliant pass by Mesut Özil. Aubameyang scored his second in the 48th minute. Despite Ashley Barnes scoring to cut the deficit for Burnley, Alex Iwobi insured that Arsenal would walk away with all 3 points in stoppage time.

Arsenal faced Brighton away from home on Boxing Day. Aubameyang scored a goal early on after some brilliant footwork from Alexandre Lacazette. Despite the early lead, Jürgen Locadia scored, capitalizing on Stephan Lichtsteiner's error, forcing a draw at Falmer Stadium.

Arsenal's last game of 2018 was against title contenders Liverpool F.C. at Anfield. Arsenal got off to the perfect start with an 11th-minute goal from Ainsley Maitland-Niles. However, Liverpool responded brilliantly, with Roberto Firmino scoring twice within the space of a minute right after Arsenal's opener. Sadio Mané made matters worse with a goal in the 32nd minute. Mohammed Salah scored a penalty just before halftime, and Firmino got his hat trick with another penalty in the 55th minute, as Arsenal fell to a 5–1 defeat.

January 

Arsenal started 2019 with a 4–1 victory against relegation contenders Fulham. Granit Xhaka, Alexandre Lacazette, Aaron Ramsey, and Pierre-Emerick Aubameyang scored for the Gunners; Aboubakar Kamara scored for the visitors.

Arsenal kicked off their FA Cup campaign away to Blackpool. Joe Willock scored a brace and Alex Iwobi added another en route to a 3–0 victory.

Arsenal lost again away in the league, Declan Rice's goal was enough for West Ham to snatch the 3 points at London Stadium. However, the Gunners responded in their next match, a 2–0 victory against rivals Chelsea at Emirates Stadium courtesy of Alexandre Lacazette and Laurent Koscielny goals took Arsenal within 3 points of the opponent. Despite the victory, the Gunners took a massive blow, as Hector Bellerín tore his anterior cruciate ligament, ruling him out for the rest of the season.

Next up was an FA Cup match against in-form rivals Manchester United. Alexis Sánchez scored for United against his former side. It was quickly made 2–0 in favor of the away team through Jesse Lingard. Pierre-Emerick Aubameyang halved the deficit just before the break, however Anthony Martial wrapped up the victory for United as Gunners were eliminated, losing 3–1.

Arsenal's final game in January came at home to Cardiff City, who were playing their first match since the death of Emiliano Sala. Aubameyang scored the first goal of the game, slotting his penalty home. Lacazette doubled the advantage after making a brilliant run into the box. Nathaniel Mendez-Laing scored a stoppage-time consolation for Cardiff. The victory sent Arsenal up to 4th place over Chelsea.

February

Arsenal's first match of February was a tough one, away to title contenders and defending champions Manchester City. Sergio Agüero scored for City in the 1st minute of the match. However, the Gunners responded, Laurent Koscielny nodded home from close range in the 10th minute. Agüero scored his second just before the break, and City extended their lead to 3–1 with a controversial goal from Agüero, thus sealing his hat trick.

Arsenal faced relegation-threatened Huddersfield away from home. Alex Iwobi scored first, before Lacazette doubled the advantage. Huddersfield scored a last-minute consolation, Sead Kolašinac scoring an own goal.

After more than two months away from Europe, the Gunners were back in Europa League action via a trip to Barysaw to face Belarusian minnows BATE Borisov. However, a lacklustre display ensued, and Stanislaw Drahuns header on the stroke of half time, coupled with Alexandre Lacazette's late red card, saw BATE record a famous 1–0 win and an advantage to take to North London.

However, the second leg had a fairly varying script to the first game, with defensive errors from BATE ultimately gifting Arsenal a 3–0 win, after an early own goal from Zakhar Volkov, coupled with free headers from Shkodran Mustafi and Sokratis Papastathopolous guided Arsenal into the last-16.

The Gunners built on the victory with a routine 2–0 home win over Southampton, earned after early goals from Lacazette and Henrikh Mkhitaryan. The Arsenal faithful then witnessed yet another Emirates Stadium win, with midfield masterclasses from Mkhitaryan and returning Mesut Özil setting up a 5–1 dismantling of Bournemouth. Both Özil and Mkhitaryan scored, with the latter setting up goals from Laurent Koscielny and Pierre-Emerick Aubameyang, whilst Lacazette was on the scoresheet for the third successive league match, bending home a wonderful free-kick with 12 minutes to play.

March

A testing March fixture schedule opened with a daunting trip to top-four rivals Tottenham Hotspur. Delays in the construction of Spurs new stadium meant the match was to be staged at Wembley, and the Gunners made a flying start, with Aaron Ramsey scoring for the fourth time at the national ground to put the visitors ahead on 16 minutes.
A staggering double-save from Bernd Leno retained Arsenal's clean sheet before Tottenham were awarded a penalty mired in offside controversy in the 74th minute. Harry Kane buried the penalty to level the scores before Aubameyang was clipped in the penalty area in stoppage time.
However, the Gabonese was denied from the spot, and Lucas Torreira was subsequently sent off late on as the Gunners had to settle for a frustrating 1–1 draw.

Things worsened in midweek as, despite going ahead after three minutes from Alex Iwobi, the Gunners fell to another road defeat as Stade Rennais earned a convincing 3–1 win in the Europa League round of 16 first leg. The turning point was undoubtedly Papastathopoulos's red card shortly before the break, with Rennes levelling a minute later through Benjamin Bourigeaud. In the second period, the Gunners completely fell apart, with Nacho Monreal's own goal and Ismaila Sarr's late header inflicting a dangerous wound upon the Gunners.

Arsenal then had a stern test forthcoming. Manchester United were the visitors to Emirates Stadium, and a tense encounter ensued. United were still unbeaten domestically under Ole Gunnar Solskjaer, but that was about to change. Despite the Red Devils dominating in chances, a resolute Arsenal backline, coupled with defensive errors at the other end, saw Granit Xhaka's long-range attempt misjudged by goalkeeper David de Gea to but Arsenal in front, before a penalty from Aubameyang saw the Gabonese make amends for his miss at Spurs to seal a vital 2–0 win.

The Gunners next fixture was at home against Rennes in the second leg of their round-of-16 tie. Trailing 3–1 from the first leg, Arsenal made the perfect start, with Aubameyang poking home Ramsey's cross after just five minutes to put them ahead. He then delivered a superb cross for Ainsley Maitland-Niles-Niles to make it 2–0 and put Arsenal ahead on away goals inside fifteen minutes.
Rennes threatened sporadically, but Aubameyang added his second late on to wrap up a 3–0 triumph and 4–3 aggregate win.

April

April began with Arsenal seeking to rise to third after Tottenham's defeat at Liverpool closed the top-four gap to just a single point.
The Gunners duly gathered the necessary three points after goals in either half from Aaron Ramsey and Alexandre Lacazette earned the Gunners a 2–0 victory over Newcastle United. It was also their 10th successive league win at the Emirates Stadium, the first time they had achieved such a run since its opening in 2006.

However, the Gunners' were hauled back out of the top four next time out after Phil Jagielka's 10th-minute goal earned Everton a 1–0 win over the listless Gunners.

Arsenal needed to bounce back, and had no better opportunity to do so than in the first-leg of their Europa League quarter-final tie, against one of the favourites, Italian giants SSC Napoli. And the Gunners responded, claiming an impressive 2–0 win and duly seize control of the tie. Aaron Ramsey had put the Gunners ahead early, before Lucas Torreira's effort on 25 minutes deflected in off Kalidou Koulibaly to settle the match.

Despite lying fifth in the table and on course for the Europa League semi-finals, Arsenal's away form had been sketchy all season long, and it was perhaps rather disappointing that the Gunners had to wait nine months prior to their first clean sheet on the road in the Premier League in a rather bizarre 1–0 win at Watford.
The majority of the games action occurred inside the first eleven minutes, with Pierre-Emerick Aubameyang opening the scoring on ten minutes with one of the strangest goals of the season, with the lethal marksman managing to nip ahead of goalkeeper Ben Foster, and the Watford man hacked his clearance straight at Aubameyang as the ball rolled into the net.
A minute later, Troy Deeney received his marching orders after elbowing Lucas Torreira in midfield. The ten-man Hornets did try hard, but ultimately fell to their first defeat of the month.

Arsenal then earned a second successive 1–0 win away from home as Alexandre Lacazette's stunning 36th-minute free-kick, coupled with a resolute defensive performance from the Gunners, saw them seal a vital win in Naples against Napoli, thus recording a 3–0 aggregate victory and subsequently qualifying them for the semi-finals for the second successive season. They were then drawn against Spanish outfit Valencia CF, who had ruthlessly dispatched fellow Spaniards Villarreal 5–1 on aggregate in the last eight.

Everything was going smoothly in North London prior to the Gunners home match against safety-hunting Crystal Palace. However, a dull first-half display saw Unai Emerys side head into the break a goal behind after Christian Bentekes early header, his first goal all year long.
However, Arsenal made a swift start to the second period, with Mesut Özil's ingenious chip on 47 minutes making it 1–1.
Nonetheless, quickfire goals after the hour from Wilfried Zaha and James McArthur further extended Palaces lead to 3–1, and though Aubameyang pulled a goal back, the Gunners fell to a morale-shattering 3–2 defeat in their first league defeat at home since August.

They failed to respond in their next encounter, a trip to Wolverhampton Wanderers, and a first half blitz from the high-flying Pack seeing them take a 3–0 advantage into the break after goals from Ruben Neves, Conor Coady and Diogo Jota. Sokratis Papastathopolous then scored his first league goal from the Gunners with ten minutes to play, but it wasn't enough as Wolves sealed a superb 3–1 win.
Another capitulation ensued away to Leicester City next time out. At half-time, the game was locked at 0–0 but the Gunners were indeed a man down after a disputable Ainsley Maitland-Niles red card.
With an hour played, Youri Tielemans headed the Foxes in front, before a late brace from the Gunners'  arch-nemesis Jamie Vardy wrapped up a 3–0 triumph for Brendan Rodgers Leicester and leave Arsenal's top-four hopes in serious jeopardy.

May

However, Europe once again proved the saviour of Arsenal, as a brace from Alexandre Lacazette laid the scaffolds for an impressive 3–1 comeback victory over Valencia in the first leg of the Europa League semi-final at the Emirates Stadium.
However, it was the visitors who took the lead in North London, with Mouctar Diakhaby finishing off a clever Valencia set-piece move with a firm header, before Alexandre Lacazette slammed home Aubameyangs square ball to level it.
Lacazette nodded home Granit Xhaka's cross before the break to make it 2–1 before Aubameyang wrapped up the win in the final minute of normal time, volleying home Sead Kolasinac's cross to ensure Arsenal took a healthy advantage to the second leg in Spain.

The Gunners had one foot in the Europa League final, but the top-four looked unlikely. The Gunners had to beat Brighton at home to attain any realistic chance of regaining their top-four status, and made the perfect start after Pierre-Emerick Aubameyang stroked home from the spot on nine minutes to put Arsenal in front. However, on the hour mark, Brighton were gifted a route back into the game after Solly March was hauled down from Granit Xhaka. Glenn Murray duly netted his 200th league career goal as the Seagulls earned a creditable 1–1 draw, leaving the Gunners needing to have three points and eight goal difference swing in their favour on the final day.

With the top four realistically out of reach, the Gunners travelled to Spain to contest what was arguably their most vital match of the season so far away to Valencia in the Europa League semi-final second leg.
However, Valencia-in need of a 2–0 win to progress-made a fast start, taking the lead on 11 minutes after Kevin Gameiro turned home Rodrigo's cross, but a stunning volley from Aubameyang saw the two sides head into the break locked at 1–1, with Arsenal leading 4–2 on aggregate.
Five minutes into the second period, Arsenal practically sealed progression to the final in Baku after Alexandre Lacazette rifled home Lucas Torreira's pass, before Valencia made it 2–2 after Gameiro added his second, bundling over the line.
However, the hosts found them behind again after Aubameyang poked home Maitland-Niles' low cross, before the Gunners' top scorer completed his first-ever Arsenal hat-trick, powering Henrikh Mkhitaryans through-ball, as Arsenal secured a famous 4–2 win, subsequently swaggering into the UEFA Europa League final for the first time since its 2009 rebrand, hammering Valencia 7–3 on aggregate. Later in the day, it was confirmed that Chelsea had beaten Eintracht Frankfurt on penalties after a 2–2 aggregate draw, meaning that all four finalists in Europe that season were from England, the first time this had happened from any country in history.

Qualified for the Europa League final and out of the top-four race, Arsenal named a weakened line-up in their fixture at Burnley on the final day of the season.
After a goalless first 45', a loose ball from Ben Mee sent Aubameyang through on goal in the 52nd minute. He duly put Arsenal ahead, before volleying home Alex Iwobi's cross eleven minutes later to make it 2–0.
Ashley Barnes then pulled a goal back for the home side before substitute-18-year-old Eddie Nketiah-netted his first Premier League goal for Arsenal, as the Gunners sealed a 3–1 win, thus finishing fifth, just one point behind Tottenham Hotspur.

After the league disappointment, Arsenal had two weeks to prepare for what was dubbed as their most important game of the decade, the UEFA Europa League final against Chelsea in the Baku Olympic Stadium, Azerbaijan.
However, the build-up was mired in controversy, with the undersized Baku airports permitting just 4000 fans of each London side, not to mention the 6628 mile round-trip, but the worst was in regard to Henrikh Mkhitaryans.
One of the Gunners' better players in 2019, the fractioned relations between Armenia and Azerbaijan ensued in warnings from the Azerbaijani sports government, advising the midfielder not to travel. Mkhitaryan decided not to, with the Gunners heading to East Europe without him.

On final night, Arsenal and Chelsea walked out to an eerie atmosphere in Baku. Empty seats ringed the ground, and a listless first period ended goalless, mirroring the stark atmosphere.
However, the final burst into life in the second.
Just four minutes into the second period, Olivier Giroud nodded home Emerson Palmieri's cross against his former club to make it 1–0 Chelsea, before Pedro Rodriguez swept home on the hour to make it 2–0.
Eden Hazard then stroked home from the spot to make it 3–0, with Arsenal appearing shell-shocked to their capitulation early in the second half.
However, a stunning half-volley from Alex Iwobi with 21 minutes to go restored a glimmer of home to the Arsenal camp, but Eden Hazard soon notched his second as Chelsea sealed a 4–1 victory, leaving Arsenal empty-handed after a strenuous end to the season. It was a reasonable campaign, but the manner of their defeat to Chelsea and in the top-four race was arguably the foundation for fans irk.

Players

Transfers

Transfers in

Loans in

Transfers out

Loans out

Club

Kits
Supplier: Puma / Sponsor: Fly Emirates

Squad statistics

Appearances and goals

{| class="wikitable sortable plainrowheaders" style="text-align:center"
|-
! rowspan="2" |
! rowspan="2" |
! rowspan="2" style="width:75px;" |
! rowspan="2" style="width:180px;" |Name
! colspan="2" style="width:87px;" |Premier League
! colspan="2" style="width:87px;" |FA Cup
! colspan="2" style="width:87px;" |EFL Cup
! colspan="2" style="width:87px;" |Europa League
! colspan="2" style="width:87px;" |Total
|-
!
!Goals
!
!Goals
!
!Goals
!
!Goals
!
!Goals
|-
|1
|GK
|
| scope="row" |Petr Čech

|7
|0

|2
|0

|2
|0

|11
|0

!22
!0
|-
|2
|DF
|
| scope="row" |Héctor Bellerín

|18(1)
|0

|0
|0

|0
|0

|0
|0

!18(1)
!0
|-
|4
|MF
|
| scope="row" |Mohamed Elneny

|5(3)
|0

|1
|0

|1
|0

|5(2)
|0

!12(5)
!0
|-
|5
|DF
|
| scope="row" |Sokratis Papastathopoulos

|25
|1

|2
|0

|1
|0

|11(1)
|2

!39(1)
!3
|-
|6
|DF
|
| scope="row" |Laurent Koscielny

|13(4)
|3

|1
|0

|0(1)
|0

|10
|0

!24(5)
!3
|-
|7
|MF
|
| scope="row" |Henrikh Mkhitaryan

|19(6)
|6

|0
|0

|3
|0

|6(5)
|0

!28(11)
!6
|-
|8
|MF
|
| scope="row" |Aaron Ramsey

|13(14)
|4

|2
|0

|2(1)
|0

|6(1)
|2

!23(16)
!6
|-
|9
|FW
|
| scope="row" |Alexandre Lacazette

|27(8)
|13

|1(1)
|0

|0(2)
|1

|8(2)
|5

!36(13)
!19
|-
|10
|MF
|
| scope="row" |Mesut Özil

|20(4)
|5

|0(1)
|0

|0
|0

|8(2)
|1

!28(7)
!6
|-
|11
|MF
|
| scope="row" |Lucas Torreira

|24(10)
|2

|1
|0

|1(2)
|0

|6(6)
|0

!32(18)
!2
|-
|12
|DF
|
| scope="row" |Stephan Lichtsteiner

|10(4)
|0

|1
|0

|2
|1

|6
|0

!19(4)
!1
|-
|14
|FW
|
| scope="row" |Pierre-Emerick Aubameyang

|30(6)
|22

|1
|1

|1(1)
|0

|10(2)
|8

!42(9)
!31
|-
|15
|MF
|
| scope="row" |Ainsley Maitland-Niles

|11(5)
|1

|2
|0

|2
|0

|9(1)
|1

!24(6)
!2
|-
|16
|DF
|
| scope="row" |Rob Holding

|9(1)
|0

|0
|0

|1
|0

|5
|0

!15(1)
!0
|-
|17
|FW
|
| scope="row" |Alex Iwobi

|22(13)
|3

|2
|1

|2(1)
|0

|6(5)
|2

!32(19)
!6
|-
|18
|DF
|
| scope="row" |Nacho Monreal

|21(1)
|1

|0
|0

|2
|0

|10(2)
|0

!33(3)
!1
|-
|19
|GK
|
| scope="row" |Bernd Leno

|31(1)
|0

|0
|0

|1
|0

|3
|0

!35(1)
!0
|-
|20
|DF
|
| scope="row" |Shkodran Mustafi

|31
|2

|0(1)
|0

|2
|0

|5(1)
|1

!38(2)
!3
|-
|22
|MF
|
| scope="row" |Denis Suárez

|0(4)
|0

|0
|0

|0
|0

|0(2)
|0

!0(6)
!0
|-
|23
|FW
|
| scope="row" |Danny Welbeck

|1(7)
|1

|0
|0

|2
|2

|4
|2

!7(7)
!5
|-
|25
|DF
|
| scope="row" |Carl Jenkinson

|2(1)
|0

|1
|0

|1
|0

|3
|0

!7(1)
!0
|-
|27
|DF
|
| scope="row" |Konstantinos Mavropanos

|3(1)
|0

|0
|0

|0
|0

|0
|0

!3(1)
!0
|-
|29
|MF
|
| scope="row" |Matteo Guendouzi

|23(10)
|0

|0(1)
|0

|3
|0

|7(4)
|1

!33(15)
!1
|-
|31
|DF
|
| scope="row" |Sead Kolašinac

|22(2)
|0

|2
|0

|0
|0

|8(2)
|0

!32(4)
!0
|-
|34
|MF
|
| scope="row" |Granit Xhaka

|29
|4

|1
|0

|1
|0

|9
|0

!40
!4
|-
|43
|MF
|
| scope="row" | Charlie Gilmour

|0
|0

|0
|0

|0
|0

|0(2)
|0

!0(2)
!0
|-
|47
|DF
|
| scope="row" | Zech Medley

|0
|0

|0(1)
|0

|0
|0

|0(2)
|0

!0(3)
!0
|-
|49
|FW
|
| scope="row" | Eddie Nketiah

|0(5)
|1

|1
|0

|0(1)
|0

|2
|0

!3(6)
!1
|-
|53
|DF
|
| scope="row" | Julio Pleguezuelo

|0
|0

|0
|0

|1
|0

|0
|0

!1
!0
|-
|59
|MF
|
| scope="row" | Joe Willock

|1(1)
|0

|1
|2

|0
|0

|2(1)
|1

!4(2)
!3
|-
|87
|FW
|
| scope="row" | Bukayo Saka

|0(1)
|0

|0(1)
|0

|0
|0

|1(1)
|0

!1(3)
!0
|-
! colspan="16" |Players out on loan for rest of the season
|-
|13
|GK
|
| scope="row" |David Ospina

|0
|0

|0
|0

|0
|0

|0
|0

!0
!0
|-
|21
|DF
|
| scope="row" |Calum Chambers

|0
|0

|0
|0

|0
|0

|0
|0

!0
!0
|-
|26
|GK
|
| scope="row" |Emiliano Martinez

|0
|0

|0
|0

|0
|0

|1
|0

!1
!0
|-
|55
|MF
|
| scope="row" |Emile Smith Rowe

|0
|0

|0
|0

|2
|1

|3(1)
|2

!5(1)
!3
|-
|N/A
|FW
|
| scope="row" |Takuma Asano

|0
|0

|0
|0

|0
|0

|0
|0

!0
!0
|}

Goalscorers

Disciplinary record

Clean sheets

Pre-season and friendlies

Friendlies

International Champions Cup

Competitions

Overview

{|class="wikitable" style="text-align:left"
|-
!rowspan=2 style="width:140px;"|Competition
!colspan=8|Record
|-
!style="width:30px;"|
!style="width:30px;"|
!style="width:30px;"|
!style="width:30px;"|
!style="width:30px;"|
!style="width:30px;"|
!style="width:30px;"|
!style="width:50px;"|
|-
|Premier League

|-
|FA Cup

|-
|EFL Cup

|-
|Europa League

|-
!Total

Premier League

League table

Results summary

Result by matchday

Matches
On , the Premier League fixtures for the forthcoming season were announced.

FA Cup

EFL Cup

UEFA Europa League

Group stage

Knockout phase

Round of 32

Round of 16

Quarter-finals

Semi-finals

Final

Coaching Staff
Updated 19 July 2018.

Awards

Arsenal Player of the Month award

Awarded monthly to the player that was chosen by fan voting on Arsenal.com

Arsenal Goal of the Month award

Awarded monthly to the goal that was chosen by fan voting on Arsenal.com

Sponsorship

References

Arsenal
Arsenal F.C. seasons
Arsenal
Arsenal
Arsenal